5-Trifluoromethyl-2-aminoindane (TAI) is a psychoactive drug and research chemical with putative entactogenic effects. It functions as a selective serotonin releasing agent (SSRA). TAI is the aminoindane analogue of norfenfluramine and is approximately 50% as neurotoxic in comparison.

References 

2-Aminoindanes
Trifluoromethyl compounds
Serotonin releasing agents
Entactogens and empathogens